Z. candida  may refer to:
 Zephyranthes candida, the white fairy lily or white rain lily, a plant species native to the Rio de la Plata region of South America
 Ziba candida, a sea snail species

See also
 Candida (disambiguation)